The 2007 Toronto International Film Festival was a 32nd annual film festival held in Toronto, Ontario, Canada. It ran from September 6, 2007 to September 15, 2007. The lineup consisted of 349 films from 55 countries, selected from 4156 submissions. The selection included 275 mid- to feature-length films, of which 234 were premieres, with 71 by first-time directors.
The festival was attended by members of the industry, press and general public. It opened with the world premiere of Jeremy Podeswa's Fugitive Pieces, a film based on the international bestselling novel by Anne Michaels, and closed with Paolo Barzman's Emotional Arithmetic.

Film reception
Critical favourites included No Country for Old Men, The Diving Bell and the Butterfly and 4 Months, 3 Weeks and 2 Days which were equally well received at the Cannes Film Festival, plus the Joy Division biopic Control which, along with the eponymously titled documentary on the band, Joy Division, was picked up by The Weinstein Company. Peter Howell of the Toronto Star named Sidney Lumet's Before the Devil Knows You're Dead a major Oscar contender. The audience favourite, David Cronenberg's Eastern Promises, won the top prize at the festival. The New York Times pointed out that two previous winners had gone on to win Best Picture Oscars.

Highly discussed but divisive films among the public and critics include comedies Juno and Margot at the Wedding, the Bob Dylan biopic I'm Not There and Brian De Palma's Iraq War documentary Redacted. Films expected to stir controversy for their transgressive sexual content, such as Ang Lee's Lust, Caution, Alan Ball's Nothing Is Private and Martin Gero's Young People Fucking, did divide audiences but without fanfare. The Assassination of Jesse James by the Coward Robert Ford and Across the Universe both won their share of supporters despite previous reports of shooting delays and director-studio clashes.

Awards
 Chris Chong Chan Fui's Pool (Kolam) won the Award for Best Canadian Short Film
 Stéphane Lafleur's Continental, a Film Without Guns won the Citytv Award for Best Canadian First Feature Film
 Guy Maddin's My Winnipeg won the Toronto-City Award for Best Canadian Feature Film
 Israel Cárdenas and Laura Amelia Guzmán's Cochochi won the DIESEL Discovery Award
 Anahí Berneri's Encarnación won the Artistic Innovation Award
 Rodrigo Plá's La Zona won the Prize of the International Critics (FIPRESCI Prize)
 David Cronenberg's Eastern Promises won the Cadillac People's Choice Award
 Jason Reitman's Juno was first runner-up
 Ellen Spiro and Phil Donahue's Body of War was second runner-up

In addition, film director and historian Peter Bogdanovich was awarded the International Federation of Film Archives Award for his contribution towards film preservation. The award was presented at a screening of Jean Renoir's Grand Illusion (1937) which Bogdanovich selected to illustrate the importance of film restoration.

Programmes

Canada First!

The Canada First! programme features first or second time Canadian film directors and established Canadian filmmakers who have not previously appeared in the festival. Eight films were selected to appear in the festival. Stéphane Lafleur's directorial debut Continental, a Film Without Guns won the Citytv Award for Best Canadian First Feature Film and a CDN$15 000 bursary.

 Amal directed by Richie Mehta
 Continental, a Film Without Guns (Continental, un film sans fusil) directed by Stéphane Lafleur
 Just Buried directed by Chaz Thorne
 Mona's Daughters (Le Cèdre penché) directed by Rafaël Ouellet
 They Wait directed by Ernie Barbarash
 This Beautiful City directed by Ed Gass-Donnelly
 Walk All Over Me directed by Robert Cuffley
 Young People Fucking directed by Martin Gero

Canadian Open Vault

The Canadian Open Vault programme features a recently restored and iconic Canadian film. Quebec-based filmmaker Francis Mankiewicz's Good Riddance was selected. The film has previously won eight Genie Awards and appeared on every Canada's Ten Best film survey.

 Good Riddance (Les Bons Débarras, 1980) directed by Francis Mankiewicz

Canadian Retrospective

The Canadian Retrospective programme features a section of films representing an aspect of the history of Canadian cinema. It was the seventh year the festival has held the retrospective. Influential Québécois filmmaker Michel Brault was spotlighted through nine films he directed or shot. He has been credited for his visual style and creating some of the most important films to come from Quebec. In conjunction, the Toronto International Film Festival Group published a book on Brault, Cinema as History: Michel Brault and Modern Quebec by Andre Loiselle.

 Acadia Acadia?!? (L'Acadie, l'Acadie?!?, 1971) directed by Michel Brault and Pierre Perrault
 Chronicle of a Summer (Chronique d'un été, 1961) directed by Edgar Morin and Jean Rouch
 Drifting Upstream (Entre la mer et l'eau douce, 1967) directed by Michel Brault
 Geneviève (1964) directed by Michel Brault
 Wrestling (La Lutte, 1961) directed by Claude Fournier, Marcel Carrière, Claude Jutra and Michel Brault
 The Paper Wedding (Les Noces de papier, 1989) directed by Michel Brault
 Orders (Les Ordres, 1974) directed by Michel Brault
 The Moon Trap (Pour la suite du monde, 1963) directed by Pierre Perrault and Michel Brault
 The Snowshoers (Les Raquetteurs, 1968) directed by Gilles Groulx and Michel Brault

Contemporary World Cinema

The Contemporary World Cinema programme features films from around the world. It included premieres and prize-winning films from other festivals. Sixty-two films were selected, including eight from Canada.

 All Hat — Leonard Farlinger
 American Venus — Bruce Sweeney
 And Along Come Tourists (Am Ende kommen Touristen) — Robert Thalheim
 Before I Forget (Avant que j'oublie) — Jacques Nolot
 The Band's Visit (Bikur Hatizmoret) — Eran Kolirin
 The Banishment (Izgnanie) — Andrey Zvyagintsev
 Barcelona (A Map) (Barcelona (un mapa)) — Ventura Pons
 Battle for Haditha — Nick Broomfield
 Breakfast with Scot — Laurie Lynd
 Brick Lane — Sarah Gavron
 California Dreamin' (Endless) (California Dreamin' (Nesfarsit)) — Cristian Nemescu
 Chop Shop — Ramin Bahrani
 Summit Circle (Contre toute espérance) — Bernard Émond
 The Counterfeiters (Die Fälscher) — Stefan Ruzowitzky 
 Two Ladies (Dans la vie) — Philippe Faucon
 Days and Clouds (Giorni e nuvole) — Silvio Soldini
 The Edge of Heaven (Auf der Anderen Seite) — Fatih Akin
 Empties (Vratné Lahve) — Jan Svěrák
 Intimate Enemies (L'Ennemi intime) — Florent-Emilio Siri
 Erik Nietzsche The Early Years (Erik Nietzsche de unge år) — Jacob Thuesen
 Faro, Goddess of the Waters (Faro, la reine des eaux) — Salif Traoré
 Forever Never Anywhere (Immer Nie am Meer) — Antonin Svoboda
 Garage — Lenny Abrahamson
 A Gentle Breeze in the Village (Tennen Kokekkō) — Nobuhiro Yamashita
 Gone with the Woman (Tatt av kvinnen) — Petter Næss
 Happiness (Haeng-bok) — Hur Jin-ho
 The Home Song Stories — Tony Ayres
 In Memory of Myself (In memoria di me) — Saverio Costanzo
 Iska's Journey (Iszka utazása) — Csaba Bollók
 Jar City (Mýrin) — Baltasar Kormákur
 Jellyfish (Meduzot) — Shira Geffen and Etgar Keret
 Just Like Home (Hjemve) — Lone Scherfig
 King of California directed by Mike Cahill
 Kings directed by Tom Collins
 L'ora di punta — Vincenzo Marra
 The Mourning Forest (Mogari No Mori) — Naomi Kawase
 Munyurangabo — Lee Isaac Chung
 Mutum — Sandra Kogut
 My Brother Is an Only Child (Mio fratello è figlio unico) — Daniele Luchetti
 New York City Serenade — Frank Whaley
 Normal — Carl Bessai
 Our Private Lives (Nos vies privées) — Denis Côté
 On the Wings of Dreams (Swopnodanay) — Golam Rabbany Biplob
 Philippine Science (Pisay) — Auraeus Solito
 The Pope's Toilet (El Baño del Papa) — Enrique Fernández and César Charlone
 Run, Fat Boy, Run — David Schwimmer
 Secret Sunshine (Miryang) — Lee Chang-dong
 The Secrets — Avi Nesher
 The Shock Doctrine — Alfonso Cuarón, Jonás Cuarón and Naomi Klein
 Slingshot (Tirador) — Brillante Mendoza
 Son of Rambow — Garth Jennings 
 Starting Out in the Evening — Andrew Wagner
 The Stone Angel — Kari Skogland
 A Stray Girlfriend (Una novia errante) — Ana Katz
 To Love Someone (Den Man Älskar) — Åke Sandgren
 The Trap (Klopka) — Srdan Golubović
 Under the Same Moon (La Misma Luna) — Patricia Riggen
 Unfinished Sky — Peter Duncan
 Unfinished Stories (Ravayat haye na tamam) — Pourya Azarbayjani
 The Last Mistress (Une vieille maîtresse) — Catherine Breillat
 Weirdsville — Allan Moyle
 Wolfsbergen — Nanouk Leopold

Dialogues: Talking With Pictures

The Dialogues: Talking With Pictures series features a selection of classic films which are chosen and introduced by well-known directors or artists who have found a given film influential or pivotal throughout the course of their own career.  Eight films were selected between nine filmmakers and artists.

 Alice Doesn't Live Here Anymore (1974) directed by Martin Scorsese; introduced by actress Ellen Burstyn
 The Best Years of Our Lives (1946) directed by William Wyler; introduced by director Sidney Lumet
 Bucking Broadway (1917) directed by John Ford; introduced by director Peter Bogdanovich
 Closely Watched Trains (Ostře Sledované Vlaky, 1966) directed by Jiří Menzel; introduced by director Ken Loach
 La jetée (1962) directed by Chris Marker; introduced by architect Bruce Kuwabara
 Oh! What a Lovely War (1969) directed by Richard Attenborough; introduced by Lord Richard Attenborough
 Rodgers and Hammerstein's Flower Drum Song (1961) directed by Henry Koster; introduced by actress Nancy Kwan and director Arthur Dong
 The Virgin Spring (Jungfrukällan, 1960) directed by Ingmar Bergman; introduced by actor Max von Sydow

Discovery

The Discovery programme features the work of new film directors from around the world. Fourteen films were selected. Israel Cárdenas and Laura Amelia Guzmán's feature debut Cochochi won the DIESEL Discovery Award and a CDN$10 000 bursary. The International Federation of Film Critics returned to the festival for the 16th year and awarded Rodrigo Plá's La Zona the FIPRESCI Prize.

 The Babysitters directed by David Ross
 Blind directed by Tamar van den Dop
 Cochochi directed by Israel Cárdenas and Laura Amelia Guzmán
 Corroboree directed by Ben Hackworth
 Frozen directed by Shivajee Chandrabhushan
 I Am from Titov Veles (Jas Sum od Titov Veles) directed by Teona Strugar Mitevska
 King of the Hill (El rey de la montaña) directed by Gonzalo López-Gallego
 The Passage directed by Mark Heller
 Roming directed by Jiří Vejdělek
 September directed by Peter Carstairs
 Those Three (An Seh) directed by Naghi Nemati
 With Your Permission (Til Døden Os Skiller) directed by Paprika Steen
 The World Unseen directed by Shamim Sarif
 La Zona directed by Rodrigo Plá

Doc Talks

The Doc Talk series features discussions with various documentary filmmakers on topics such as the future of the medium and their work and its subject matter. Clips from their new and upcoming documentaries are screened. The series was opened to the public for the first time. Topics included biography films, Michel Brault, war and democracy.

 Biography: Complicated Lives with Scott Hicks (GLASS: a portrait of Philip in twelve parts), Peter Raymont (A Promise to the Dead: The Exile Journey of Ariel Dorfman) and Peter Askin (Trumbo)
 Canadian Retrospective: Michel Brault with Denys Arcand (Days of Darkness (L'Âge des ténèbres)) and Michel Brault (Chronicle of a Summer); moderated by André Loiselle (Cinema as History: Michel Brault and Modern Quebec)
 Covering War with Michael Tucker (The Bullet-Proof Salesman), Phil Donahue and Ellen Spiro (Body of War)
 Why Democracy? with Nick Fraser (Storyville)

Future Projections

The Future Projections programme features non-theatrical installations in various mediums. This marked the programme's inaugural run. Nine installations were curated by the Toronto International Film Festival Group and other Torontonian cultural institutions. Admission was free for all exhibitions, with the exception of the exhibit at the Power Plant Contemporary Art Gallery which was free only to Festival passholders.

 Best Minds Part One created by Jeremy Shaw; curated by Wayne Baerwaldt
 Darfur/Darfur created by various artists; curated by Leslie Thomas
 Death in the Land of Encantos (Kagadanan sa Banwaan ning mga Engkanto) created by Lav Diaz; curated by Cameron Bailey
 Francesco Vezzoli: A True Hollywood Story! created by Francesco Vezzoli; curated by Gregory Burke
 Into the Pixel created by various artists; organized by Nick Pagee
 Late Fragment directed by Daryl Cloran, Anita Doron and Mateo Guez; produced by Anita Lee and Ana Serrano
 The Soft Revolution directed by Brian Johnson and Anthony Roberts
 Tyranny created by Ryan Sluggett; organized by Wayne Baerwaldt
 Wildflowers of Manitoba created by Noam Gonick and Luis Jacob; curated by Wayne Baerwaldt

Gala Presentations

Gala Presentations spotlights prestige films of Canadian, American and foreign-language origins in equal measure. They are often world or North American premieres and are screened at the Roy Thomson Hall. Twenty films were selected. David Cronenberg's Eastern Promises received the Cadillac People's Choice Award.

 Fugitive Pieces directed by Jeremy Podeswa
 Rendition directed by Gavin Hood
 Michael Clayton directed by Tony Gilroy
 Battle for Terra directed by Aristomenis Tsirbas
 Eastern Promises directed by David Cronenberg
 Second Wind (Le Deuxième Souffle) directed by Alain Corneau
 The Last Lear directed by Rituparno Ghosh
 Elizabeth: The Golden Age directed by Shekhar Kapur
 The Jane Austen Book Club directed by Robin Swicord
 Sleuth directed by Kenneth Branagh
 Across the Universe directed by Julie Taymor 
 Cassandra's Dream directed by Woody Allen
 Cleaner directed by Renny Harlin
 Days of Darkness (L'Âge des ténèbres) directed by Denys Arcand
 Blood Brothers (Tian Tang Kou) directed by Alexi Tan
 Reservation Road directed by Terry George
 The Walker directed by Paul Schrader
 Closing the Ring directed by Richard Attenborough 
 Caramel directed by Nadine Labaki 
 Emotional Arithmetic directed by Paolo Barzman

Masters

The Masters programme features films by world-renowned filmmakers. Twenty films were selected.

 Alexandra directed by Alexander Sokurov
 Romance of Astrea and Celadon (Les Amours d'Astrée et de Céladon) directed by Eric Rohmer
 Beyond the Years (Chun-Nyun-Hack) directed by Im Kwon-taek
 Chaos (Heya Fawda) directed by Youssef Chahine and Youssef Khaled
 Christopher Columbus – The Enigma (Cristóvão Colombo – O Enigma) directed by Manoel de Oliveira
 Disengagement directed by Amos Gitai
 The Past (El Pasado) directed by Héctor Babenco
 Fados directed by Carlos Saura
 A Girl Cut in Two (La Fille coupée en deux) directed by Claude Chabrol
 Four Women (Naalu Pennunga) directed by Adoor Gopalakrishnan
 Glory to the Filmmaker! (Kantoku Banzai!) directed by Takeshi Kitano
 It's a Free World... directed by Ken Loach
 The Man from London (A London Férfi) directed by Béla Tarr
 The Duchess of Langeais (Ne touchez pas la hache) directed by Jacques Rivette
 One Hundred Nails (Centochiodi) directed by Ermanno Olmi
 The Princess of Nebraska directed by Wayne Wang
 A Thousand Years of Good Prayers directed by Wayne Wang
 Ulzhan directed by Volker Schlöndorff
 Flight of the Red Balloon (Le Voyage du ballon rouge) directed by Hou Hsiao-hsien
 The Voyeurs (Ami, Yasin Ar Amar Madhubala) directed by Buddhadev Dasgupta

Mavericks

Mavericks features discussions with film industry and other professionals. Four events were held on a variety of socio-political topics. Former President of the United States Jimmy Carter and his wife Rosalynn Carter discussed their activist work after his presidential term. Comedians Bill Maher and Larry Charles tackled religion. Mira Nair brought together three other Indian filmmakers who covered HIV/AIDS and screened four new short films on the subject. Finally, the conflict in Sudan was discussed by the Chief Prosecutor of the International Criminal Court, Luis Moreno-Ocampo, and a panel of filmmakers.
 Everything to Gain: A Conversation with Jimmy and Rosalynn Carter with Jimmy and Rosalynn Carter (Jonathan Demme's Man from Plains); moderated by Allan Gregg
 Mira Nair Presents: Four Views on AIDS in India with Mira Nair (Migration), Santosh Sivan (Prarambha), Vishal Bhardwaj (Blood Brothers) and Farhan Akhtar (Positive); moderated by Mira Nair and Ashok Alexander (Bill & Melinda Gates Foundation's Indian HIV/AIDS initiative)
 Religulous: A Conversation with Bill Maher and Larry Charles with Bill Maher and Larry Charles (Religulous)
 The Time Is Now: A Conversation About Darfur with Luis Moreno-Ocampo (Chief Prosecutor of the International Criminal Court), Don Cheadle (actor, activist), Adam Sterling (co-founder, Sudan Divestment Task Force), Ted Braun (director, Darfur Now), Mark Jonathan Harris (producer, Darfur Now) and Cathy Schulman (producer, Darfur Now)

Midnight Madness
 Dainipponjin directed by Hitoshi Matsumoto
 The Devil's Chair directed by Adam Mason
 Flash Point (Dao Huo Xian) directed by Wilson Yip
 Frontier(s) (Frontière(s)) directed by Xavier Gens
 George A. Romero's Diary of the Dead directed by George A. Romero
 Inside (À l'intérieur) directed by Alexandre Bustillo and Julien Maury
 The Mother of Tears directed by Dario Argento
 Stuck directed by Stuart Gordon
 Sukiyaki Western Django directed by Takashi Miike
 Vexille directed by Fumihiko Sori

Real to Reel
 Algeria, Unspoken Stories (Algérie, histoires à ne pas dire) directed by Jean-Pierre Lledo
 Amazing Journey: The Story of The Who directed by Paul Crowder and Murray Lerner
 Terror's Advocate (L'Avocat de la terreur) directed by Barbet Schroeder
 Body of War directed by Ellen Spiro and Phil Donahue
 Callas Assoluta directed by Philippe Kohly
 Children of the Sun (Yaldey Hashemesh) directed by Ran Tal
 Darfur Now directed by Ted Braun
 The Dictator Hunter directed by Klaartje Quirijns
 Dinner with the President: A Nation's Journey directed by Sabiha Sumar and Sachithanandam Sathananthan

 Encounters at the End of the World directed by Werner Herzog
 Fengming, a Chinese Memoir (He Fengming) directed by Wang Bing
 GLASS: a portrait of Philip in twelve parts directed by Scott Hicks
 Heavy Metal in Baghdad directed by Eddy Moretti and Suroosh Alvi
 Hollywood Chinese directed by Arthur Dong
 Iron Ladies of Liberia directed by Daniel Junge and Siatta Scott Johnson
 A Jihad for Love directed by Parvez Sharma
 Joy Division directed by Grant Gee
 Lou Reed's Berlin directed by Julian Schnabel
 Man of Cinema: Pierre Rissient directed by Todd McCarthy
 The Mosquito Problem and Other Stories (Problemat s komarite i drugi istorii) directed by Andrey Paounov
 My Enemy's Enemy directed by Kevin Macdonald
 My Kid Could Paint That directed by Amir Bar-Lev
 Obscene directed by Neil Ortenberg and Daniel O'Connor
 Operation Filmmaker directed by Nina Davenport
 Please Vote for Me directed by Weijun Chen
 A Promise to the Dead: The Exile Journey of Ariel Dorfman directed by Peter Raymont
 Rebellion: the Litvinenko Case (Bunt. Delo Litvinenko) directed by Andrei Nekrasov
 Surfwise directed by Doug Pray
 Trumbo directed by Peter Askin
 Useless (Wu Yong) directed by Jia Zhangke
 Very Young Girls directed by David Schisgall
 The Wild Horse Redemption directed by John Zaritsky

Short Cuts Canada
 Automoto directed by Neil McInnes and Cathy McInnes
 Blood Will Tell directed by Andrew McPhillips
 Boar Attack directed by Jay White
 Bumblebee directed by Jonathan van Tulleken
 Burgeon and Fade directed by Audrey Cummings
 Can You Wave Bye-Bye? directed by Sarah Galea-Davis
 The Canadian Shield directed by Simon Ennis
 Code 13 directed by Mathieu Denis
 The Colony directed by Jeff Barnaby
 Congratulations Daisy Graham directed by Cassandra Nicolaou
 A Cure for Terminal Loneliness directed by Samir Rehem
 Cursing Hanley directed by Kelly Harms
 Dada Dum directed by Britt Randle
 Diamonds in a Bucket directed by Sherry White
 Dust Bowl Ha! Ha! directed by Sébastien Pilote
 Farmer's Requiem directed by Ramses Madina
 found oBjects directed by David Birnbaum
 Four Walls directed by Raha Shirazi
 francas directed by Eduardo Menz
 Gene Boy Came Home directed by Alanis Obomsawin
 God Provides directed by Brian M. Cassidy and Melanie Shatzky
 Hastings Street directed by Larry Kent
 Hirsute directed by A.J. Bond
 Hymn to Pan directed by François Miron
 I Have Seen the Future directed by Cam Christiansen
 I've Never Had Sex... directed by Robert Kennedy
 Knights of Atomikaron directed by Adam Brodie and Dave Derewlany
 The Last Moment directed by Deco Dawson
 Latchkey's Lament directed by Troy Nixey
 Loudly, Death Unties directed by Sheila Pye and Nicholas Pye
 Madame Tutli-Putli directed by Chris Lavis and Maciek Szczerbowski
 No Bikini directed by Claudia Morgado Escanilla
 Paradise directed by Jesse Rosensweet
 ReOrder directed by Sean Garrity
 The Schoolyard (Les Grands) directed by Chloé Leriche
 Shooting Geronimo directed by Kent Monkman
 A Short Film About Falling directed by Peter Lynch and Max Dean
 Smile directed by Julia Kwan
 Teenage Girl directed by Greg Atkins
 Terminus directed by Trevor Cawood
 Terry Southern's Plums and Prunes directed by Dev Khanna
 Three Beans for George directed by Sean Anicic
 Tic Tac Toe directed by Matthew Swanson
 The Whole Day Through directed by Adam Budd

Special Presentations
 4 Months, 3 Weeks and 2 Days (4 luni, 3 sǎptǎmâni şi 2 zile) directed by Cristian Mungiu 
 Angel directed by François Ozon
 The Assassination of Jesse James by the Coward Robert Ford directed by Andrew Dominik
 Atonement directed by Joe Wright 
 Battle in Seattle directed by Stuart Townsend
 Before the Devil Knows You're Dead directed by Sidney Lumet
 Before the Rains directed by Santosh Sivan
 Bill directed by Melisa Wallack and Bernie Goldmann
 The Brave One directed by Neil Jordan
 Captain Mike Across America directed by Michael Moore
 To Each His Own Cinema (Chacun son cinéma) directed by Theo Angelopoulos, Olivier Assayas, Bille August, Jane Campion, Youssef Chahine, Chen Kaige, David Cronenberg, Jean-Pierre Dardenne, Luc Dardenne, Manoel de Oliveira, Raymond Depardon, Atom Egoyan, Amos Gitai, Hou Hsiao-hsien, Alejandro González Iñárritu, Aki Kaurismäki, Abbas Kiarostami, Takeshi Kitano, Andrei Konchalovsky, Claude Lelouch, Ken Loach, David Lynch, Nanni Moretti, Roman Polanski, Raúl Ruiz, Walter Salles, Elia Suleiman, Tsai Ming-liang, Gus Van Sant, Lars von Trier, Wim Wenders, Wong Kar-wai and Zhang Yimou
 Chaotic Ana (Caótica Ana) directed by Julio Medem
 Death Defying Acts directed by Gillian Armstrong
 The Girl in the Park directed by David Auburn
 Grand Illusion (La Grand Illusion, 1937) directed by Jean Renoir; introduced by director Peter Bogdanovich
 Here Is What Is directed by Adam Vollick, Daniel Lanois and Adam Samuels
 Honeydripper directed by John Sayles
 I'm Not There directed by Todd Haynes 
 In Bloom directed by Vadim Perelman
 In the Valley of Elah directed by Paul Haggis 
 Into the Wild directed by Sean Penn 
 Juno directed by Jason Reitman 
 Lars and the Real Girl directed by Craig Gillespie
 Love Comes Lately directed by Jan Schütte
 Lust, Caution (pinyin: Sè, Jiè) directed by Ang Lee
 Mad Detective directed by Johnnie To and Wai Ka-fai
 Man from Plains directed by Jonathan Demme
 Margot at the Wedding directed by Noah Baumbach
 Married Life directed by Ira Sachs
 Mongol directed by Sergei Bodrov
 My Winnipeg directed by Guy Maddin
 Nightwatching directed by Peter Greenaway
 No Country for Old Men directed by Joel Coen and Ethan Coen 
 Nothing Is Private directed by Alan Ball

 Persepolis directed by Vincent Paronnaud and Marjane Satrapi
 Poor Boy's Game directed by Clement Virgo
 Rails & Ties directed by Alison Eastwood
 Reclaim your brain (Free Rainer - Dein Fernseher Lügt) directed by Hans Weingartner
 Redacted directed by Brian De Palma
 Romulus, My Father directed by Richard Roxburgh
 The Savages directed by Tamara Jenkins
 The Diving Bell and the Butterfly (Le Scaphandre et le papillon) directed by Julian Schnabel 
 Shadows directed by Milcho Manchevski
 Shake Hands with the Devil directed by Roger Spottiswoode
 Silk directed by François Girard
 The Sun Also Rises (Tai Yang Zhao Chang Sheng Qi) directed by Jiang Wen
 The Take directed by Brad Furman
 Then She Found Me directed by Helen Hunt 
 The Visitor directed by Tom McCarthy 
 When Did You Last See Your Father? directed by Anand Tucker

Sprockets Family Zone
 The Besieged Fortress (La Citadelle assiégée) directed by Philippe Calderon
 Max & Co directed by Frédéric Guillaume and Samuel Guillaume
 Mid Road Gang (Ma-Mha-See-Kha-Krub) directed by Pantham Thongsang and Somkiat Vithuranich
 Nocturna directed by Victor Maldonado and Adriàn García
 The Substitute (Vikaren) directed by Ole Bornedal

Vanguard
 Boy A directed by John Crowley
 Les Chansons d'amour directed by Christophe Honoré
 Chrysalis directed by Julien Leclercq
 Control directed by Anton Corbijn
 Déficit directed by Gael García Bernal
 Ex Drummer directed by Koen Mortier

 The Exodus directed by Pang Ho-Cheung
 Help Me Eros (Bang Bang Wo Ai Shen) directed by Lee Kang-sheng
 me (yo) directed by Rafa Cortés
 Mister Lonely directed by Harmony Korine
 Water Lilies (Naissance des pieuvres) directed by Céline Sciamma
 The Orphanage (El Orfanato) directed by Juan Antonio Bayona
 Paranoid Park directed by Gus Van Sant
 Ping Pong Playa directed by Jessica Yu
 Sad Vacation directed by Shinji Aoyama
 Smiley Face directed by Gregg Araki
 White Lies, Black Sheep directed by James Spooner
 XXY directed by Lucía Puenzo

Visions
 Buddha Collapsed Out of Shame (Buda As Sharm Foru Rikht) directed by Hana Makhmalbaf 
 Dans la Ville de Sylvie (En la ciudad de Sylvia) directed by José Luis Guerín
 Death in the Land of Encantos (Kagadanan sa Banwaan ning mga Engkanto) directed by Lav Diaz
 Dr. Plonk directed by Rolf de Heer
 Eat, For This is My Body directed by Michelange Quay
 Encarnación directed by Anahí Berneri
 Happy New Life (Boldog új élet) directed by Árpád Bogdán
 Import Export directed by Ulrich Seidl 
 L'Amour caché directed by Alessandro Capone
 M directed by Lee Myung-se
 Night directed by Lawrence Johnston
 Pink (Roz) directed by Alexander Voulgaris
 Ploy directed by Pen-ek Ratanaruang
 Silent Light (Stellet Licht) directed by Carlos Reygadas 
 Silent Resident (Weisse Lilien) directed by Christian Frosch
 Beneath the Rooftops of Paris (Sous les toits de Paris) directed by Hiner Saleem
 Time to Die (Pora Umierać) directed by Dorota Kędzierzawska
 The Tracey Fragments directed by Bruce McDonald
 You, the Living (Du levande) directed by Roy Andersson

Wavelengths
 The Acrobat directed by Chris Kennedy
 All That Rises directed by Daïchi Saïto
 The Anthem directed by Apichatpong Weerasethakul
 At Sea directed by Peter Hutton
 The Butterfly in Winter directed by Ute Aurand and Maria Lang
 Capitalism: Slavery directed by Ken Jacobs
 Cross Worlds directed by Cécile Fontaine
 Discoveries on the Forest Floor 1-3 directed by Charlotte Pryce
 Echo directed by Izabella Pruska-Oldenhof
 ecp 2D: sun directed by John Price
 Erzählung directed by Hannes Schüpbach
 Europa 2005, 27 Octobre directed by Jean-Marie Straub and Danièle Huillet
 Evertwo Circumflicksrent...Page 298 directed by Bruce McClure
 Wrong Moves (Faux Mouvements) directed by Pip Chodorov
 gone directed by Karoe Goldt
 Monica directed by Enrico Mandirola
 Papillon directed by Olivier Fouchard
 Pool (Kolam) directed by Chris Chong Chan Fui
 Pour Vos Beaux Yeux directed by Henri Storck
 Profit Motive and the Whispering Wind directed by John Gianvito
 Quartet directed by Nicky Hamlyn
 Schindler's Houses (Photography and Beyond Part 12) directed by Heinz Emigholz
 Tape Film directed by Chris Kennedy
 What the Water Said, nos. 4-6 directed by David Gatten

Canada's Top Ten
TIFF's annual Canada's Top Ten list, its national critics and festival programmers poll of the ten best feature and short films of the year, was released in December 2007. For the first time, separate lists of feature and short films were announced.

Feature films
Amal — Richie Mehta
Continental, a Film Without Guns (Continental, un film sans fusil) — Stéphane Lafleur
Days of Darkness (L'Âge des ténèbres) — Denys Arcand
Eastern Promises — David Cronenberg
Fugitive Pieces — Jeremy Podeswa
My Winnipeg — Guy Maddin
A Promise to the Dead: The Exile Journey of Ariel Dorfman — Peter Raymont
The Tracey Fragments — Bruce McDonald
Up the Yangtze — Yung Chang
Young People Fucking — Martin Gero

Short films
Code 13 — Mathieu Denis
The Colony — Jeff Barnaby
Dust Bowl Ha! Ha! — Sébastien Pilote
Farmer's Requiem — Ramses Madina
I Have Seen the Future — Cam Christiansen
I Met the Walrus — Josh Raskin
Madame Tutli-Putli — Chris Lavis, Maciek Szczerbowski
Pool — Chris Chong Chan Fui
The Schoolyard (Les Grands) — Chloé Leriche
Terminus — Trevor Cawood

References

External links

 Official website
 tiffreviews.com
 TIFF Spotlight at TheGATE.ca
 2007 Toronto International Film Festival at IMDb

2007
2007 film festivals
2007 in Toronto
2007 in Canadian cinema
2007 festivals in North America